Play in Group B of the 1990 FIFA World Cup completed on 18 June 1990. Cameroon won the group, and advanced to the second round, along with Romania and World Cup holders Argentina. The Soviet Union failed to advance.

Standings

Matches
All times local (CEST/UTC+2)

Argentina vs Cameroon

Soviet Union vs Romania

Argentina vs Soviet Union

Cameroon vs Romania

Argentina vs Romania

Cameroon vs Soviet Union

Group B
Argentina at the 1990 FIFA World Cup
Romania at the 1990 FIFA World Cup
Soviet Union at the 1990 FIFA World Cup
Cameroon at the 1990 FIFA World Cup